Wong Kwok Pun (also known as Laurence Wong, ; Cantonese ; Jyutping: wong4 gwok3 ban1; Mandarin Pinyin: Huang Guobin) is a Hong Kong scholar, poet and translator. He is most famous for rendering Dante's La Divina Commedia into Chinese while preserving the terza rima rhyming scheme, an approach no Chinese translator had ever tried to take.

He was born in Hong Kong in 1946 and grew up there, his original hometown being Guangzhou. He received his BA (English and Translation) and MPhil (English) from The University of Hong Kong and his PhD (East Asian Studies) from the University of Toronto. He taught in the Department of English Studies and Comparative Literature at The University of Hong Kong from 1982 to 1986 and in the Department of Languages, Literatures, and Linguistics at York University in Canada from 1987 to 1992. After being the professor of the Department of Translation at Lingnan University, he is now teaching in the Chinese University of Hong Kong as research professor.

He is a polyglot, familiar with Classical Greek, Latin, French, Italian, German, and Spanish, as well as Chinese and English. He studied for some time in Florence to better understand Dante.

One of his poems, Listening to Louis Chen's Zither, was selected into the Chinese textbooks for secondary school students in Hong Kong.

Most of his books are published in Taiwan, including the ground-breaking Dante translation, though he lives and works in Hong Kong.

Besides poetry and translation, he has published several books of literary criticism and translation studies.

External links
Biographical sketch and some titles of his works (in Chinese)

Wong, Kwok Pun
Alumni of the University of Hong Kong
20th-century Chinese translators
21st-century Chinese translators
Translators from English
Translators from Italian
Translators to Chinese
Academic staff of the University of Hong Kong
Living people
Year of birth missing (living people)
Academic staff of Lingnan University
Academic staff of York University